Helen Meier (17 April 1929 – 13 February 2021) was a Swiss writer.

Biography
After working in England, France, and Italy, she attended the University of Fribourg, subsequently working for the Swiss Red Cross and as a special education teacher in Heiden. She was discovered at the Festival of German-Language Literature, where she received a prize for her story, Lichtempfindlich.

Helen Meier died in Trogen on 13 February 2021 at the age of 91.

Awards
 (1984)
Rauris Literature Prize (1985)
Prize of the Schweizerische Schillerstiftung (2000)
Contribution to Pro Helvetia (2000)
Droste-Preis (2000)
Kulturpreis des Kantons St. Gallen (2001)
Kulturpreis des Kantons Appenzell Ausserrhoden (2017)

Works
Trockenwiese (1984)
Das einzige Objekt in Farbe (1985)
Das Haus am See (1987)
Das Gelächter (1989)
Lebenleben (1989)
Der Thurgau und seine Menschen (1990)
Die Suche nach dem Paradies. 36 Photographien aus dem Appenzellerland (1991)
Nachtbuch (1992)
Die Thur. Von der Quelle bis zur Mündung (1992)
Die Novizin (1995)
Letzte Warnung (1996)
Liebe Stimme (2000)
Adieu, Herr Landammann! Sieben Begegnungen mit Jacob Zellweger-Zuberbühler (2001)
Schlafwandel. Eine Erzählung (2006)
Kleine Beweise der Freundschaft (2014)
Die Agonie des Schmetterlings. Böse Geschichten (2015)
Übung im Torkeln entlang des Falls. Ein Lesebuch (2017)
Der weisse Vogel, der Hut und die Prinzessin. 23 Märchen (2019)

References

1929 births
2021 deaths
Swiss writers
People from Rorschach, Switzerland